Erotesis is a genus of insects belonging to the family Leptoceridae.

Species:
 Erotesis baltica
 Erotesis melanella
 Erotesis schachti

References

Leptoceridae
Trichoptera genera